Hartmut Rosa (born August 15, 1965) is a German sociologist and political scientist.

Life 
Hartmut Rosa was born in Lörrach. He grew up in Grafenhausen in the Black Forest, where he spoke the local Alemannic dialect and played the organ in the Protestant parish. After graduating from high school (Hochrhein-Gymnasium Waldshut) in 1985 and completing his civilian service, he began studying political science, philosophy and German studies at the University of Freiburg in 1986, which he graduated with honours in 1993. In 1997, he graduated summa cum laude from the Humboldt University of Berlin and received his Ph.D. for his dissertation on political philosophy according to Charles Taylor. He was awarded the title of Dr. rer. Soc (doctor rerum socialium; Ph.D. in Social sciences).

He worked as a research assistant at the chair of Political Science III at the University of Mannheim (1996–1997) and as a research assistant at the Institute for Sociology at the University of Jena (1997–1999). There, he habilitated with his study Social Acceleration: A New Theory of Modernity in the fields of Sociology and Political Science. During the summer semester of 2004, he held the deputy chair of Political Science/Political Theory at the University of Duisburg-Essen. During the winter semester 2004–2005 and the summer semester 2005, respectively, he held the deputy chair of political science at the Faculty of Philosophy and Social Sciences at the University of Augsburg. In 2005, Hartmut Rosa was appointed professor for General and Theoretical Sociology at the University of Jena.

In the winter of 1988–1989, he spent one semester with a scholarship of the German Academic Scholarship Foundation at the London School of Economics and Political Science. He visited the USA for study purposes several times, including as a research assistant at the Department of Government/Center of European Studies at Harvard University. He received the Feodor Lynen Research Fellowship of the Alexander von Humboldt Foundation for his work as a visiting professor at the New School University in New York City in 2001–2002. He has been associated with the New School University as a visiting professor since 2002.

Research 
Rosa's research is focused on the areas of sociological diagnosis of time and the analysis of modernity, normative and empirical foundations of social criticism, subject and identity theories, sociology of time and theory of acceleration, as well as what he calls the "sociology of world relations". His books are received internationally and have been translated into 15 languages.

 Sociological studies of time and modern theory form the basis of his habilitation thesis "Social Acceleration. The Change in Temporal Structures". The "technically or economically induced acceleration" is apparent in the rapid development of technology in the 19th and 20th centuries and the social acceleration of people. The history of modernity is simultaneously the history of accelerating change. The time-saving nature of technical progress leads to a time shortage rather than a gain of time. According to Rosa, the multitude of possibilities leads to the fact that a person can no longer exhaust the possibilities given to them in the course of their life. The "rate of increase exceeds the rate of acceleration", which leads to the fact that what has just been experienced is no longer up to date and individuals have no chance of dying "satisfied with life". Rosa uses the "slippery slope phenomenon" as a sociological counterpart to the biological Red Queen hypothesis: According to this, human beings must never – or rather can never – rest or be satisfied, because otherwise they would have to reckon with a loss or disadvantage. Rosa no longer sees any possibilities for humanity to control life, since the pace of acceleration has taken on a life of its own. Most recently, he has dealt in particular with the topos of desynchronisation, i.e. the increasing divergence of the time structures of various social sub-areas such as politics and the economy.
 "Communitarianism debate": Rosa particularly advocates the "dignity of labour" and its social orientation and benefits for the common good, especially in reference on the topic of socio-ecological degrowth. He has further written several (introductory) texts on communitarian political and democratic theory, including his dissertation on the Canadian philosopher Charles Taylor.
 Resource mobilization: Rosa's third research focus is based upon the question which mobilisation resources of civic engagement are resultant from the general development of modern society. He also analyses which political views are more likely to result in voluntary or civic engagement. According to Rosa, identification with the state ("my country") generates a moral obligation to ensure that this state acts accordingly. In order to be able to guarantee this, the individual must commit themselves to their personal socio-political engagement.
 The metatheory of the social sciences from a history of ideas perspective: In doing so, Rosa emphasises the merits of the so-called Cambridge School, whose members have, in his eyes, "sharpened the awareness of methodological questions and theoretical presuppositions in dealing with the history of ideas and, in the process, opened up a fruitful methodological discussion". Rosa calls for a questioning of political theories with regard to their content and impact. This intends examining the contexts of tradition and discourse as well as normative or ideological implications, in which he sees the central concern of a critical conceptual history. This research focus combines his previous thematic fields. Rosa seeks new connections between current social theory (through time-diagnostic analysis) and a normative, critical social philosophy, whose foundations he sees in the nexus of "considerations of politics, identity and modernity theory".
 With his resonance theory, Rosa presents an alternative concept to the omnipresence of alienation. Drafted within the framework of a "sociology of world relations", resonance theory elevates everyday experiences of successful, "resonant" connections to our world, and uses those as a critical groundwork. Rosa sees himself as continuing in the critical theory traditions of Erich Fromm.

Awards 
 2006: research award by State of Thuringia
 2016: Tractatus Award
 2018: Erich Fromm Prize
 2018: Paul Watzlawick Ring of Honor (German: Paul-Watzlawick-Ehrenring)
 2019: Honorary degree Universiteit voor Humanistiek, Utrecht 
 2019: Patronage of the UNESCO chair "" as successor to Michel Serres at the Université de Nantes
 2020: Werner Heisenberg Medal by  Alexander von Humboldt Foundation
 2020: Rob Rhoads Global Citizenship Education Award from the University of California
 2020: member of the Academia Europaea
 2021: together with Klaus Dörre and Stephan Lessenich the Thuringian Research Prize in the category basic research

References

University of Freiburg alumni
Cultural academics
Epistemologists
Non-fiction writers
Academic staff of the University of Jena
The New School faculty
Academic staff of the University of Augsburg
1965 births
Members of Academia Europaea
Living people
German sociologists
German political scientists